Mere Bharat Ke Kanth Haar is the state song of the Indian state of Bihar. The lyrics were written by Satya Narayan and the music was composed by Hari Prasad Chaurasia and Shivkumar Sharma. The song was officially adopted in March 2012.

Lyrics

See also
 List of Indian state songs

References

External links
Mere Bharat Ke Kanth Haar
Lyrics

Indian state songs
Symbols of Bihar